The Kakar (Pashto: کاکړ) is a Gharghashti Pashtun tribe, based in Afghanistan, parts of Iran, northern Balochistan in Pakistan.

Origins
Kakars are descendants of Dani (or Daani) who was the son of Gharghasht. Gharghasht was the son of Qais Abdul Rashid, the founder of the Pashtuns who himself was the descendant of Afghana (or Avagana) the progenitor of Afghanistan and modern-day Pashtuns. 

In Herat, the Kakar are sometimes referred to as Kak. Historically, the tribe has been called Kakar but may have been referred to as Kak-kor (lit. family of Kak). The tomb of Kakar is in front of Herat central Jamia Masjid's gate. Some historians argue that Kakar was first buried in Kohistan, but Ghiyath al-Din Ghori brought the body to be re-buried in a mosque in the city of Herat.

History

Until the fifteenth century, Kakars along with Tajiks, Baloch and Farsiwans mainly inhabited the Qandahar region and because of the predominant position of Abdali and Ghilzai Pashtuns in Qandahar region during and around fourteenth century, Tajiks, Hazaras, Kakars and Baloch lost their previous possessions and were forced to pay tax or revenue to warlords from either Abdali or Ghilzai tribal divisions. Eventually, some of these indigenous people assimilated and became part of dominant Pashtun confederacy, while others moved further west or to north Afghanistan.

Prior to the partition of British India, Hindu members of the Kakar tribe, known as Sheen Khalai, resided in the Qila Abdullah and Qila Saifullah, Quetta, Loralai and Maikhter regions of province of Baluchistan now in Pakistan.

After 1947, they migrated to Unniara, Rajasthan and other parts of India.

Notable people
Nashenas, Afghan Singer
Faizullah Kakar, Afghan epidemiologist and public leader
Kader Khan, Indian Actor
Dadullah Afghan Taliban senior commander
Muhammad Sarwar Khan Kakar, was a Pakistani Senator
Hafiz Sahar, Editor-in-Chief of national newspaper in Afghanistan (1970s), Fulbright Scholar, Professor of Journalism and Mass communication in Afghanistan and USA.
Mohammad Rabbani, Prime Minister of Afghanistan under Taliban regime.
Abdul Waheed Kakar, Chief of Army Staff of the Pakistan Army (1993–1996)
Abdur Rab Nishtar, Muslim League member, Pakistani movement activist and politician.
Safwat Ghayur, commandant of Pakistan's Frontier Constabulary
Mullah Bakht alias Mansoor Dadullah, Senior Afghan Taliban Commander
Owais Ahmed Ghani, Governor Khyber Pakhtunkhwa (N-W.F.P.), Pakistan. Governor Balochistan, Pakistan. Federal Minister, Provincial Minister (N-W.F.P) Pakistan, Pakistan Tehreek e Insaf (founding member)
Palay Khan (Palay Shah), was from Khosthi Syed Tribe anti-Raj fighter
Nawab Muhammad Ayaz Khan Jogezai, Pakistani Politician
Anwar ul Haq Kakar, Pakistani Politician and Senator
Rozi Khan Kakar, Pakistani Senator from Quetta
Usman Kakar, Pakistani politician and Senator from Muslim Bagh
Arfa Siddiq Kakar, Pakistani politician and Pashtun human rights activist from Muslim Bagh

Further reading
 Kakar tribe
 Afghan tribes, including Kakar Super Tribe
History of Pashtoons by Sardar Sher Muhammed Gandapur 
A History of Afghan, 1960, by Abdul-Hai Habibi 
The Pathans, 1967, by Sir Olaf Caroe
Tarikh-i Khan Jahani wa Makhzan-i Afghani, 1500–1600, by Khwaja Nimatullah Heravi and Hebat Khan Abubakarzai Kakar.

References

Gharghashti Pashtun tribes
Pashto-language surnames
Pakistani names
Social groups of Pakistan